Robert Emerson Swisher (July 14, 1914 – September 27, 1979) was a professional American football player who played running back for five seasons for the Chicago Bears.

He was born in 1914 in Victoria, Illinois.  By 1931 he was at Central High School in Peoria, where he participated in football, basketball, and track; his pole vault remained the record at Central until 1970.  He then played football and track at Evanston's Northwestern University.

After his time in the NFL, he coached at Loyola University of Los Angeles and the Naval Air Station in Millington, Tennessee.

He died in 1979.

References

External links

1914 births
1979 deaths
American football running backs
Chicago Bears players
Northwestern Wildcats football players
Players of American football from Illinois
Sportspeople from Peoria, Illinois